Gymnomitriaceae is a liverwort family in the order Jungermanniales.

Subfamilies and genera
Subfamilies and genera included in Gymnomitriaceae:
Acrolophozia R.M.Schust. (not assigned to a subfamily)
Nanomarsupella R.M.Schust. ex A.Hagborg (not assigned to a subfamily)
Paramomitrion R.M.Schust. (not assigned to a subfamily)
Gymnomitrioideae T.Jense
Cryptocoleopsis Amakawa
Gymnomitrion Corda
Marsupella Dumort.
Poeltia Grolle
Prasanthus Lindb.
Nardioideae Váňa
Nardia Gray

References

External links

Jungermanniales
Liverwort families